Auld Lang Syne is a comic based on the Angel television series.

Story description

'Issue #1: Angel's back on the job in Los Angeles, tracking a mysterious cult and working to solve a kidnapping. The only trouble is, a few old familiar faces keep showing up—faces he shouldn't really be seeing! And what does Spike have to do with it?'

Issue #2: A quiet night out for Spike turns into a nightmarish trip through his past, as he's repeatedly confronted by familiar, long-departed faces. How will Spike react to meeting the sins of his past up close and personal? And where's Angel in all of this?

Issue #3: Years of animosity boil over as Angel and Spike go head to head in the brawl to end all brawls through the streets of L.A. What set off this knockdown, drag-out battle, and who's really profiting from it?

Issue #4: Angel and Spike put their heads together to discover who's been manipulating them from afar! And what better way to get to the bottom of things than some good old-fashioned breaking and entering! It's an all-vampire museum heist!

Issue #5: Angel and Spike have tracked down the culprit who's been tampering with their minds! Will they be able to free themselves from her influence? Or will Spike be too busy putting the moves on her? It all ends here!

Cultural references

Auld Lang Syne – (Scots; “Days Gone By” lit., “Old Long Since”) is a poem by Robert Burns. "Auld Lang Syne" is usually sung each year on New Year's Eve in many English-speaking countries.

Continuity

The continuity of this comic is unconfirmed. In an interview Tipon was ambiguous about the timing, but said that it followed Angel comics: The Curse, and Old Friends. 
In a post at the idwpublishing site IDW Editor-in-Chief Chris Ryall agreed with a poster who posted
"So the way I understand the order is: The Curse, Old Friends, Asylum and Auld Lang Syne.I could be wrong (and I think that there is no official line on it), but the way that I am taking it is that unless a comic is very obviously set during the series then it will be set after the previous 'post-Angel' comics." 
Based on dialogue from Issue 2, it is implied that the series is set after Spike: Asylum

Canonical issues

Angel comics such as this one are not usually considered by fans as canonical. Some fans consider them stories from the imaginations of authors and artists, while other fans consider them as taking place in an alternative fictional reality. However unlike fan fiction, overviews summarising their story, written early in the writing process, were 'approved' by both Fox and Joss Whedon (or his office), and the books were therefore later published as officially Buffy merchandise.

External links
Singh, Arune, "SCOTT TIPTON SINKS HIS TEETH INTO "ANGEL: AULD LANG SYNE", Comicbookresources.com (September 29, 2006)
Dodsworth, James, "SCOTT TIPTON Fractal Matter Interview", fractalmatter.com (December 1, 2006)
Review of Auld Lang Syne at fractalmatter.com, "Auld Lang Syne Fractal Matter review", fractalmatter.com (November, 2006)
Auld Lang Syne thread at IDW Publishing forums, "Auld Lang Syne thread at IDW Publishing forums", idwpublishing.com

Angel (1999 TV series) comics
2006 comics debuts
2007 comics endings